Li-Wei Qin is an Australian cellist. He was nominated for the 2010 ARIA award ARIA Award for Best Classical Album for the album Beethoven Cello Sonatas. The album was a duo with Filipino pianist Albert Tiu.

Awards and nominations

ARIA Music Awards
The ARIA Music Awards is an annual awards ceremony that recognises excellence, innovation, and achievement across all genres of Australian music. They commenced in 1987. 

! 
|-
| 2010
| Beethoven Cello Sonatas
| Best Classical Album
| 
| 
|-

References

External links
Li-Wei Qin, Cello

1976 births
Living people
21st-century Australian male musicians
21st-century classical musicians
Alumni of the Guildhall School of Music and Drama
Alumni of the Royal Northern College of Music
Australian cellists
Australian classical musicians
Chinese emigrants to Australia
Musicians from Shanghai
Prize-winners of the International Tchaikovsky Competition